Lycée Alexandre Dumas is a French international school in Port-au-Prince, Haiti.

Lycée Alexandre Dumas may also refer to:

 Lycée Alexandre Dumas (Saint-Cloud), in Hauts-de-Seine, France
 Lycée International Alexandre Dumas, in Algiers, Algeria
 Lycée Français Alexandre Dumas de Moscou, in Moscow, Russia